W. A. Murray was a college football coach. He was the fifth head football coach at Texas A&M University, serving from 1899 to 1901 and compiling a record of 7–8–1.

Head coaching record

References

Year of birth missing
Year of death missing
Texas A&M Aggies football coaches